Enki is the Sumerian god of water, knowledge (gestú), crafts (gašam), and creation (nudimmud), and one of the Anunnaki. He was later known as Ea or Ae in Akkadian (Assyrian-Babylonian) religion, and is identified by some scholars with Ia in Canaanite religion. The name was rendered Aos in Greek sources (e.g. Damascius).

He was originally the patron god of the city of Eridu, but later the influence of his cult spread throughout Mesopotamia and to the Canaanites, Hittites and Hurrians. He was associated with the southern band of constellations called stars of Ea, but also with the constellation AŠ-IKU, the Field (Square of Pegasus). Beginning around the second millennium BCE, he was sometimes referred to in writing by the numeric ideogram for "40", occasionally referred to as his "sacred number". The planet Mercury, associated with Babylonian Nabu (the son of Marduk) was, in Sumerian times, identified with Enki.

Many myths about Enki have been collected from various sites, stretching from Southern Iraq to the Levantine coast. He is mentioned in the earliest extant cuneiform inscriptions throughout the region and was prominent from the third millennium down to the Hellenistic period.

Etymology 
The exact meaning of Enki's name is uncertain: the common translation is "Lord of the Earth". The Sumerian En is translated as a title equivalent to "lord" and was originally a title given to the High Priest. Ki means "earth", but there are theories that ki in this name has another origin, possibly kig of unknown meaning, or kur meaning "mound".
The name Ea is allegedly Hurrian in origin while others claim that his name 'Ea' is possibly of Semitic origin and may be a derivation from the West-Semitic root *hyy meaning "life" in this case used for "spring", "running water". In Sumerian E-A means "the house of water", and it has been suggested that this was originally the name for the shrine to the god at Eridu. 

It has also been suggested that the original non-anthropomorphic divinity at Eridu was not Enki but Abzu. The emergence of Enki as the divine lover of Ninhursag, and the divine battle between the younger Igigi divinities and Abzu, saw the Abzu, the underground waters of the Aquifer, becoming the place in which the foundations of the temple were built. With some Sumerian deity names as Enlil there are variations like Elil. En means "Lord" and E means "temple". It is likely that E-A is the Sumerian short form for "Lord of Water", as Enki is a god of water. Ab in Abzu also means water.

Worship
The main temple to Enki was called E-abzu, meaning "abzu temple" (also E-en-gur-a, meaning "house of the subterranean waters"), a ziggurat temple surrounded by Euphratean marshlands near the ancient Persian Gulf coastline at Eridu. It was the first temple known to have been built in Southern Iraq.  Four separate excavations at the site of Eridu have demonstrated the existence of a shrine dating back to the earliest Ubaid period, more than 6,500 years ago.  Over the following 4,500 years, the temple was expanded 18 times, until it was abandoned during the Persian period. On this basis Thorkild Jacobsen has hypothesized that the original deity of the temple was Abzu, with his attributes later being taken by Enki over time. P. Steinkeller believes that, during the earliest period, Enki had a subordinate position to a goddess (possibly Ninhursag), taking the role of divine consort or high priest, later taking priority. The Enki temple had at its entrance a pool of fresh water, and excavation has found numerous carp bones, suggesting collective feasts. Carp are shown in the twin water flows running into the later God Enki, suggesting continuity of these features over a very long period.  These features were found at all subsequent Sumerian temples, suggesting that this temple established the pattern for all subsequent Sumerian temples. "All rules laid down at Eridu were faithfully observed".

Iconography

Enki was the keeper of the divine powers called Me, the gifts of civilization. He is often shown with the horned crown of divinity.

On the Adda Seal, Enki is depicted with two streams of water flowing into each of his shoulders: one the Tigris, the other the Euphrates. Alongside him are two trees, symbolizing the male and female aspects of nature. He is shown wearing a flounced skirt and a cone-shaped hat. An eagle descends from above to land upon his outstretched right arm. This portrayal reflects Enki's role as the god of water, life, and replenishment.

Considered the master shaper of the world, god of wisdom and of all magic, Enki was characterized as the lord of the Abzu (Apsu in Akkadian), the freshwater sea or groundwater located within the earth. In the later Babylonian epic Enûma Eliš, Abzu, the "begetter of the gods", is inert and sleepy but finds his peace disturbed by the younger gods, so sets out to destroy them. His grandson Enki, chosen to represent the younger gods, puts a spell on Abzu "casting him into a deep sleep", thereby confining him deep underground. Enki subsequently sets up his home "in the depths of the Abzu." Enki thus takes on all of the functions of the Abzu, including his fertilising powers as lord of the waters and lord of semen.

Early royal inscriptions from the third millennium BCE mention "the reeds of Enki". Reeds were an important local building material, used for baskets and containers, and collected outside the city walls, where the dead or sick were often carried. This links Enki to the Kur or underworld of Sumerian mythology. In another even older tradition, Nammu, the goddess of the primeval creative matter and the mother-goddess portrayed as having "given birth to the great gods," was the mother of Enki, and as the watery creative force, was said to preexist Ea-Enki. Benito states "With Enki it is an interesting change of gender symbolism, the fertilising agent is also water, Sumerian "a" or "Ab" which also means "semen". In one evocative passage in a Sumerian hymn, Enki stands at the empty riverbeds and fills them with his 'water'".

Mythology

Creation of life and sickness
The cosmogenic myth common in Sumer was that of the hieros gamos, a sacred marriage where divine principles in the form of dualistic opposites came together as male and female to give birth to the cosmos. In the epic Enki and Ninhursag, Enki, as lord of Ab or fresh water (also the Sumerian word for semen), is living with his wife in the paradise of Dilmun where

Despite being a place where "the raven uttered no cries" and "the lion killed not, the wolf snatched not the lamb, unknown was the kid-killing dog, unknown was the grain devouring boar", Dilmun had no water and Enki heard the cries of its goddess, Ninsikil, and orders the sun-god Utu to bring fresh water from the Earth for Dilmun. As a result,

Dilmun was identified with Bahrain, whose name in Arabic means "two seas", where the fresh waters of the Arabian aquifer mingle with the salt waters of the Persian Gulf. This mingling of waters was known in Sumerian as Nammu, and was identified as the mother of Enki.

The subsequent tale, with similarities to the Biblical story of the forbidden fruit, repeats the story of how fresh water brings life to a barren land. Enki, the Water-Lord then "caused to flow the 'water of the heart" and having fertilised his consort Ninhursag, also known as Ki or Earth, after "Nine days being her nine months, the months of 'womanhood'... like good butter, Nintu, the mother of the land, ...like good butter, gave birth to Ninsar, (Lady Greenery)". When Ninhursag left him, as Water-Lord he came upon Ninsar (Lady Greenery). Not knowing her to be his daughter, and because she reminds him of his absent consort, Enki then seduces and has intercourse with her. Ninsar then gave birth to Ninkurra (Lady Fruitfulness or Lady Pasture), and leaves Enki alone again. A second time, Enki, in his loneliness finds and seduces Ninkurra, and from the union Ninkurra gave birth to Uttu (weaver or spider, the weaver of the web of life).

A third time Enki succumbs to temptation, and attempts seduction of Uttu. Upset about Enki's reputation, Uttu consults Ninhursag, who, upset at the promiscuous wayward nature of her spouse, advises Uttu to avoid the riverbanks, the places likely to be affected by flooding, the home of Enki. In another version of this myth Ninhursag takes Enki's semen from Uttu's womb and plants it in the earth where eight plants rapidly germinate. With his two-faced servant and steward Isimud, "Enki, in the swampland, in the swampland lies stretched out, 'What is this (plant), what is this (plant).' His messenger Isimud, answers him; 'My king, this is the tree-plant', he says to him. He cuts it off for him and he (Enki) eats it". And so, despite warnings, Enki consumes the other seven fruit. Consuming his own semen, he falls pregnant (ill with swellings) in his jaw, his teeth, his mouth, his hip, his throat, his limbs, his side and his rib. The gods are at a loss to know what to do; chagrined they "sit in the dust". As Enki lacks a birth canal through which to give birth, he seems to be dying with swellings. The fox then asks Enlil, King of the Gods, "If I bring Ninhursag before thee, what shall be my reward?" Ninhursag's sacred fox then fetches the goddess.

Ninhursag relents and takes Enki's Ab (water, or semen) into her body, and gives birth to gods of healing of each part of the body: Abu for the jaw, Nanshe for the throat, Nintul for the hip, Ninsutu for the tooth, Ninkasi for the mouth, Dazimua for the side, Enshagag for the limbs. The last one, Ninti (Lady Rib), is also a pun on Lady Life, a title of Ninhursag herself. The story thus symbolically reflects the way in which life is brought forth through the addition of water to the land, and once it grows, water is required to bring plants to fruit. It also counsels balance and responsibility, nothing to excess.

Ninti, the title of Ninhursag, also means "the mother of all living", and was a title later given to the Hurrian goddess Kheba. This is also the title given in the Bible to Eve, the Hebrew and Aramaic Ḥawwah (חוה), who was made from the rib of Adam, in a strange reflection of the Sumerian myth, in which Adam – not Enki – walks in the Garden of Paradise.

Making of man
After six generations of gods, in the Babylonian Enûma Eliš, in the seventh generation, (Akkadian "shapattu" or sabath), the younger Igigi gods, the sons and daughters of Enlil and Ninlil, go on strike and refuse their duties of keeping creation working. Abzu, god of fresh water, co-creator of the cosmos, threatens to destroy the world with his waters, and the gods gather in terror. Enki promises to help and puts Abzu to sleep, confining him in irrigation canals and places him in the Kur, beneath his city of Eridu. But the universe is still threatened, as Tiamat, angry at the imprisonment of Abzu and at the prompting of her son and vizier Kingu, decides to take back creation herself. The gods gather again in terror and turn to Enki for help, but Enki – who harnessed Abzu, Tiamat's consort, for irrigation – refuses to get involved. The gods then seek help elsewhere, and the patriarchal Enlil, their father, god of Nippur, promises to solve the problem if they make him King of the Gods. In the Babylonian tale, Enlil's role is taken by Marduk, Enki's son, and in the Assyrian version it is Ashur. After dispatching Tiamat with the "arrows of his winds" down her throat and constructing the heavens with the arch of her ribs, Enlil places her tail in the sky as the Milky Way, and her crying eyes become the source of the Tigris and Euphrates. But there is still the problem of "who will keep the cosmos working". Enki, who might have otherwise come to their aid, is lying in a deep sleep and fails to hear their cries. His mother Nammu (creatrix also of Abzu and Tiamat) "brings the tears of the gods" before Enki and says

Enki then advises that they create a servant of the gods, humankind, out of clay and blood. Against Enki's wish, the gods decide to slay Kingu, and Enki finally consents to use Kingu's blood to make the first human, with whom Enki always later has a close relationship, the first of the seven sages, seven wise men or "Abgallu" (ab = water, gal = great, lu = man), also known as Adapa. Enki assembles a team of divinities to help him, creating a host of "good and princely fashioners". He tells his mother:

Adapa, the first man fashioned, later goes and acts as the advisor to the King of Eridu, when in the Sumerian King-List, the me of "kingship descends on Eridu".

Samuel Noah Kramer believes that behind this myth of Enki's confinement of Abzu lies an older one of the struggle between Enki and the Dragon Kur (the underworld).

The Atrahasis-Epos has it that Enlil requested from Nammu the creation of humans. And Nammu told him that with the help of Enki (her son) she can create humans in the image of gods.

Uniter of languages
In the Sumerian epic entitled Enmerkar and the Lord of Aratta, in a speech of Enmerkar, an introductory spell appears, recounting Enki having had mankind communicate in one language (following Jay Crisostomo 2019); or, in other accounts, it is a hymn imploring Enki to do so. 
In either case, Enki "facilitated the debates between [the two kings] by allowing the world to speak one language," the presumed superior language of the tablet, i.e. Sumerian.

Jay Crisostomo's 2019 translation, based on the recent work of C. Mittermayer is:

S.N. Kramer's 1940 translation is as follows:

The deluge

In the Sumerian version of the flood myth, the causes of the flood and the reasons for the hero's survival are unknown due to the fact that the beginning of the tablet describing the story has been destroyed. Nonetheless, Kramer has stated that it can probably be reasonably inferred that the hero Ziusudra survives due to Enki's aid because that is what happens in the later Akkadian and Babylonian versions of the story.

In the later Legend of Atrahasis, Enlil, the King of the Gods, sets out to eliminate humanity, whose noise is disturbing his rest. He successively sends drought, famine and plague to eliminate humanity, but Enki thwarts his half-brother's plans by teaching Atrahasis how to counter these threats. Each time, Atrahasis asks the population to abandon worship of all gods except the one responsible for the calamity, and this seems to shame them into relenting. Humans, however, proliferate a fourth time. Enraged, Enlil convenes a Council of Deities and gets them to promise not to tell humankind that he plans their total annihilation. Enki does not tell Atrahasis directly, but speaks to him in secret via a reed wall. He instructs Atrahasis to build a boat in order to rescue his family and other living creatures from the coming deluge. After the seven-day deluge, the flood hero frees a swallow, a raven and a dove in an effort to find if the flood waters have receded. Upon landing, a sacrifice is made to the gods. Enlil is angry his will has been thwarted yet again, and Enki is named as the culprit. Enki explains that Enlil is unfair to punish the guiltless, and the gods institute measures to ensure that humanity does not become too populous in the future. This is one of the oldest of the surviving Middle Eastern deluge myths.

Enki and Inanna

The myth Enki and Inanna tells the story of how the young goddess of the É-anna temple of Uruk feasts with her father Enki. The two deities participate in a drinking competition; then, Enki, thoroughly inebriated, gives Inanna all of the mes. The next morning, when Enki awakes with a hangover, he asks his servant Isimud for the mes, only to be informed that he has given them to Inanna. Upset, he sends Galla to recover them. Inanna sails away in the boat of heaven and arrives safely back at the quay of Uruk. Eventually, Enki admits his defeat and accepts a peace treaty with Uruk.

Politically, this myth would seem to indicate events of an early period when political authority passed from Enki's city of Eridu to Inanna's city of Uruk.

In the myth of Inanna's Descent, Inanna, in order to console her grieving sister Ereshkigal, who is mourning the death of her husband Gugalana (gu 'bull', gal 'big', ana 'sky/heaven'), slain by Gilgamesh and Enkidu, sets out to visit her sister. Inanna tells her servant Ninshubur ('Lady Evening', a reference to Inanna's role as the evening star) to get help from Anu, Enlil or Enki if she does not return in three days. After Inanna has not come back, Ninshubur approaches Anu, only to be told that he knows the goddess's strength and her ability to take care of herself. While Enlil tells Ninshubur he is busy running the cosmos, Enki immediately expresses concern and dispatches his Galla (Galaturra or Kurgarra, sexless beings created from the dirt from beneath the god's finger-nails) to recover the young goddess.
These beings may be the origin of the Greco-Roman Galli, androgynous beings of the third sex who played an important part in early religious ritual.

In the story Inanna and Shukaletuda, Shukaletuda, the gardener, set by Enki to care for the date palm he had created, finds Inanna sleeping under the palm tree and rapes the goddess in her sleep. Awaking, she discovers that she has been violated and seeks to punish the miscreant. Shukaletuda seeks protection from Enki, whom Bottéro believes to be his father. In classic Enkian fashion, the father advises Shukaletuda to hide in the city where Inanna will not be able to find him. Enki, as the protector of whoever comes to seek his help, and as the empowerer of Inanna, here challenges the young impetuous goddess to control her anger so as to be better able to function as a great judge.

Eventually, after cooling her anger, she too seeks the help of Enki, as spokesperson of the "assembly of the gods", the Igigi and the Anunnaki. After she presents her case, Enki sees that justice needs to be done and promises help, delivering knowledge of where the miscreant is hiding.

Influence

Enki and later Ea were apparently depicted, sometimes, as a man covered with the skin of a fish, and this representation, as likewise the name of his temple E-apsu, "house of the watery deep", points decidedly to his original character as a god of the waters (see Oannes). Around the excavation of the 18 shrines found on the spot, thousands of carp bones were found, consumed possibly in feasts to the god. Of his cult at Eridu, which goes back to the oldest period of Mesopotamian history, nothing definite is known except that his temple was also associated with Ninhursag's temple which was called Esaggila, "the lofty head house" (E, house, sag, head, ila, high; or Akkadian goddess = Ila), a name shared with Marduk's temple in Babylon, pointing to a staged tower or ziggurat (as with the temple of Enlil at Nippur, which was known as E-kur (kur, hill)), and that incantations, involving ceremonial rites in which water as a sacred element played a prominent part, formed a feature of his worship. This seems also implicated in the epic of the hieros gamos or sacred marriage of Enki and Ninhursag (above), which seems an etiological myth of the fertilisation of the dry ground by the coming of irrigation water (from Sumerian a, ab, water or semen). The early inscriptions of Urukagina in fact go so far as to suggest that the divine pair, Enki and Ninki, were the progenitors of seven pairs of gods, including Enki as god of Eridu, Enlil of Nippur, and Su'en (or Sin) of Ur, and were themselves the children of An (sky, heaven) and Ki (earth). The pool of the Abzu at the front of his temple was adopted also at the temple to Nanna (Akkadian Sin) the Moon, at Ur, and spread from there throughout the Middle East. It is believed to remain today as the sacred pool at Mosques, or as the holy water font in Catholic or Eastern Orthodox churches.

Whether Eridu at one time also played an important political role in Sumerian affairs is not certain, though not improbable. At all events the prominence of "Ea" led, as in the case of Nippur, to the survival of Eridu as a sacred city, long after it had ceased to have any significance as a political center. Myths in which Ea figures prominently have been found in Assurbanipal's library, and in the Hattusas archive in Hittite Anatolia. As Ea, Enki had a wide influence outside of Sumer, being equated with El (at Ugarit) and possibly Yah (at Ebla) in the Canaanite 'ilhm pantheon. He is also found in Hurrian and Hittite mythology as a god of contracts, and is particularly favourable to humankind. It has been suggested that etymologically the name Ea comes from the term *hyy (life), referring to Enki's waters as life-giving. Enki/Ea is essentially a god of civilization, wisdom, and culture. He was also the creator and protector of man, and of the world in general. Traces of this version of Ea appear in the Marduk epic celebrating the achievements of this god and the close connection between the Ea cult at Eridu and that of Marduk. The correlation between the two rises from two other important connections: (1) that the name of Marduk's sanctuary at Babylon bears the same name, Esaggila, as that of a temple in Eridu, and (2) that Marduk is generally termed the son of Ea, who derives his powers from the voluntary abdication of the father in favour of his son. Accordingly, the incantations originally composed for the Ea cult were re-edited by the priests of Babylon and adapted to the worship of Marduk, and, similarly, the hymns to Marduk betray traces of the transfer to Marduk of attributes which originally belonged to Ea.

It is, however, as the third figure in the triad (the two other members of which were Anu and Enlil) that Ea acquires his permanent place in the pantheon. To him was assigned the control of the watery element, and in this capacity he becomes the shar apsi; i.e. king of the Apsu or "the abyss". The Apsu was figured as the abyss of water beneath the earth, and since the gathering place of the dead, known as Aralu, was situated near the confines of the Apsu, he was also designated as En -Ki; i.e. "lord of that which is below", in contrast to Anu, who was the lord of the "above" or the heavens. The cult of Ea extended throughout Babylonia and Assyria. We find temples and shrines erected in his honour, e.g. at Nippur, Girsu, Ur, Babylon, Sippar, and Nineveh, and the numerous epithets given to him, as well as the various forms under which the god appears, alike bear witness to the popularity which he enjoyed from the earliest to the latest period of Babylonian-Assyrian history. The consort of Ea, known as Ninhursag, Ki, Uriash Damkina, "lady of that which is below", or Damgalnunna, "big lady of the waters", originally was fully equal with Ea, but in more patriarchal Assyrian and Neo-Babylonian times plays a part merely in association with her lord. Generally, however, Enki seems to be a reflection of pre-patriarchal times, in which relations between the sexes were characterised by a situation of greater gender equality. In his character, he prefers persuasion to conflict, which he seeks to avoid if possible.

Ea and West Semitic deities
In 1964, a team of Italian archaeologists under the direction of Paolo Matthiae of the University of Rome La Sapienza performed a series of excavations of material from the third-millennium BCE city of Ebla. Much of the written material found in these digs was later translated by Giovanni Pettinato. Among other conclusions, he found a tendency among the inhabitants of Ebla, after the reign of Sargon of Akkad, to replace the name of El, king of the gods of the Canaanite pantheon (found in names such as Mikael and Ishmael), with Ia (Mikaia, Ishmaia).

Jean Bottéro (1952) and others suggested that Ia in this case is a West Semitic (Canaanite) way of pronouncing the Akkadian name Ea, associated to the Canaanite theonym Yahu, the Hebrew YHWH. Some scholars remain skeptical of the theory while explaining how it might have been misinterpreted. Ia has also been compared by William Hallo with the Ugaritic god Yamm ("Sea"), (also called Judge Nahar, or Judge River) whose earlier name in at least one ancient source was Yaw, or Ya'a.

Ea was also known as Dagon and Uanna (Grecised Oannes), the first of the Seven Sages.

See also
Ancient Near East
Azazel
Barbar Temple, a Dilmun-era temple in Bahrain devoted to the worship of Enki
 Capricorn (astrology)
Capricornus
Me (mythology)
Mesopotamian mythology

References

Notes

Citations

Works cited

Espak, Peeter (2010) The God Enki in Sumerian Royal Ideology and Mythology. Dissertationes Theologiae Universitatis Tartuensis 19. (Tartu University Press).

Further reading

External links

Ancient Mesopotamian Gods and Goddesses: Enki/Ea (god)
Enki and Ninhursag
Creation of Man
Enki and Inanna

Mesopotamian gods
Wisdom gods
Sea and river gods
Water gods
Crafts gods
Creator gods
Earth gods
Fertility gods
Characters in the Enūma Eliš
Magic gods
Knowledge gods
Primordial teachers
Time and fate gods
Mercurian deities
Trickster gods
Scribes
Piscine and amphibian humanoids